Talismán is a station along Line 4 of the Mexico City Metro, located in Gustavo A. Madero borough.

General information
The station logo depicts a stylised image of a mammoth, with raised trunk and tusks.  During the construction of this station, the  fossilised remains of a mammoth 
(Mammuthus meridionalis) were dug up by an excavation crew. The fossil is now exhibited in a display in the station.  The station was opened on 29 August 1981.

Talismán also means "amulet", and an elephant with a raised trunk is considered a good luck symbol.

This metro station, like others on Line 4, stands on Avenida Congreso de la Unión.

The western exit is on the same block as Procter & Gamble Mexico's Talismán Plant, where soap products including Camay and Safeguard are produced. Trucks delivering tallow and olive oil (raw materials for soap) are a common sight around the station.

Talisman is served by several Pesero routes to Potrero, Tepito and Merced. It is also served by RTP Bus services on Avenida Congreso de la Unión.

From 23 April to 14 June 2020, the station was temporarily closed due to the COVID-19 pandemic in Mexico.

Ridership

Exits
East: Avenida Congreso de la Unión and Oriente 171 street, Colonia Ampliación Aragón
West: Avenida Congreso de la Unión and Avenida Talismán, Colonia Granjas Modernas

References

External links
 

Mexico City Metro Line 4 stations
Railway stations opened in 1981
1981 establishments in Mexico
Mexico City Metro stations in Gustavo A. Madero, Mexico City